Deh Mian (also Romanized as Deh Mīān and Deh Meyān; also known as Deh-e Manān) is a village in Rastupey Rural District, in the Central District of Savadkuh County, Mazandaran Province, Iran. At the 2006 census, its population was 156, in 39 families.

References 

Populated places in Savadkuh County